The 1985 Princeton Tigers football team was an American football team that represented Princeton University during the 1985 NCAA Division I-AA football season. Princeton tied for second in the Ivy League.

In their first year under head coach Ron Rogerson, the Tigers compiled a 5–5 record and were also even on points, scoring 212 and allowing 212. Anthony P. DiTommaso and James G. Petrucci were the team captains.

Princeton's 5–2 conference record tied for second-best in the Ivy League standings. The Tigers outscored Ivy opponents 127 to 96. 

Princeton played its home games at Palmer Stadium on the university campus in Princeton, New Jersey.

Schedule

References

Princeton
Princeton Tigers football seasons
Princeton Tigers football